The Men's 200m T53 had its competition held on September 13 with the first round at 12:31 and the Final at 20:35.

Medalists

Results

References
Round 1 - Heat 1
Round 1 - Heat 2
Final

Athletics at the 2008 Summer Paralympics